The list of communities in Doha refers to the designated districts in the Municipality of Doha, Qatar. There are more than 60 communities in Doha.

References